The Shadow of Tragedy is a lost 1914 silent film drama short directed by and starring Arthur V. Johnson. It was produced by the Lubin Manufacturing Company of Philadelphia.

Cast
Arthur V. Johnson - Robert Sterling, the Son
Lottie Briscoe - Mary Sterling
Charles Brandt - Robert Sterling, the Father
Mary Carr - Martha Sterling, the Mother (*as Mrs. Carr)
Raymond Hackett - Robert Sterling (*as a boy)
Howard M. Mitchell - Tom, Mary's Brother
Gilbert Ely - The Librarian

References

External links
 The Shadow of Tragedy at IMDb.com

1914 films
American silent short films
Lubin Manufacturing Company films
Lost American films
American black-and-white films
Silent American drama films
1914 drama films
1910s American films
1910s English-language films